Grant Scicluna (born in 1980) is an Australian film director and writer. best known for his work on The Wilding which won the Iris Prize in 2012, and the feature film Downriver. He is a graduate of RMIT University School of Media and Communications in Melbourne.

Scicluna directed the Iris Prize short film Hurt's Rescue which premiered at the Melbourne International Film Festival in 2014.

In 2015, Scicluna made his feature debut with the Screen Australia backed Downriver which premiered at the Melbourne International Film Festival before playing at Toronto International Film Festival, with an Australian cinema release following. Downriver sold to the USA, the UK and Europe.

Scicluna lives in Melbourne, Australia and is married to designer, David Allouf. He frequently works with producer Jannine Barnes.

Filmography (as director)

References

External links

1980 births
Australian film directors
Australian screenwriters
Living people